Jon Stickley is an American guitarist. He is the leader of the Jon Stickley Trio.

References

Living people
Guitarists from North Carolina
Musicians from Durham, North Carolina
Year of birth missing (living people)